The Remington Spartan 100 is a single-shot, break-action shotgun.  It is a variant of a classical Russian IZh-18 shotgun manufactured by Izhevsk Mechanical Plant for export under trademark "Baikal", in Izhevsk, Russia.  It is marketed and distributed by Remington.

The Spartan 100 accepts -inch or 3-inch shotgun shells.  It utilizes a cross bolt safety and a selectable ejector or extractor.

Models

SPR100
The standard model SPR100 has a blued receiver, hardwood stock and fore-end, and a fixed choke.  It is chambered in 12 gauge with a 28-inch barrel, or in 20 gauge or .410 bore with a 26-inch barrel.  It weighs  pounds.

An upgraded version of the SPR100 has a nickel-plated receiver, walnut stock and fore-end, and screw-in choke tubes.  This variant is a 12 gauge with a -inch barrel.

SPR100 Sporting
The SPR100 Sporting model has a nickel-plated receiver, walnut stock and fore-end, and screw-in choke tubes.  The barrel is ported to reduce felt recoil.

SPR100 Youth
The SPR100 Youth model is chambered in 20 gauge or .410 bore.  It has a 24-inch barrel and weighs  pounds.

Notes

External links 
 Remington Spartan 100 official web page

Remington Arms firearms
Single-shot shotguns of Russia